The  is a river in Japan which flows through Gifu Prefecture. It empties into the Sai River, which is part of the Nagara River system. The river, whose name means "Frozen Dark One", was named after Mieji-juku, the 56th post town on the Nakasendō, a historical trading route.

Geography
The river flows south from the southwestern portion of Motosu, crossing over the former Nakasendō and the current Tōkaidō Main Line before reaching Ōgaki. In Ōgaki, it flows into the Sai River.

River communities
The river passes through or forms the boundary of Motosu, Hozumi, and Ōgaki, all in Gifu Prefecture.

References

Rivers of Gifu Prefecture
Rivers of Japan